Platygyrium is a genus of mosses belonging to the family Hypnaceae. 

The species of this genus are found in Eurasia and Northern America.

Species:
 Platygyrium amblyocarpum (Hampe) A.Jaeger
 Platygyrium australe (Dixon & Sainsbury) T.Arikawa
 Platygyrium brachycladon (Brid.) Kindb.
 Platygyrium decolor (Mitt.) Kindb.
 Platygyrium denticulifolium (Müll. Hal.)
 Platygyrium ferricola (Müll. Hal.) A. Jaeger
 Platygyrium fuscoluteum Cardot
 Platygyrium inflexum (Harv.) A. Jaeger
 Platygyrium intricatum (Hedw.) M. Fleisch.
 Platygyrium julaceum (Hook. ex Schwägr.) Bosch & Sande Lac.
 Platygyrium repens (Brid.) Schimp.
 Platygyrium russulum (Mitt.) A. Jaeger
 Platygyrium squarrosulum (Mont.) A. Jaeger
 Platygyrium subjulaceum (Müll. Hal.) A. Jaeger
 Platygyrium subrussulum Renauld & Cardot
 Platygyrium ussuriense Dixon & Lazarenko

References

Hypnaceae
Moss genera